St Columba's Catholic Boys' School is a Roman Catholic boys' secondary school with academy status, located in the Bexleyheath area of the London Borough of Bexley, England.

Description
St. Columba's Catholic Boys’ School was opened by the then Conservative Prime Minister Edward Heath on 7 May 1973. The lower and upper sections of the school were amalgamated on the present site in June 1990 in an extended building. A £5 million new build project on the site which included a new teaching block, new sports hall, and refurbished theatre was opened in 2005.

The school converted to academy status in September 2012, and it was previously under the direct control of Bexley London Borough Council. The school continues to coordinate with Bexley London Borough Council for admissions.

St. Columba's Catholic Boys' School are close partners with their sister school, St. Catherine's Catholic School for Girls, which is located on a separate site nearby.

The uniform for St. Columba's is black with a blue lapel for years 7–10, for Year 11 it is a yellow/gold lapel. The school tie is blue, black and yellow. In Year 11 pupils who have an outstanding attitude to learning will earn a gold tie. Recently, a new silver tie for Year 10 pupils has been introduced for an outstanding attitude to learning.

Following a short inspection of the school on 23 January 2019 James Whiting, the Ofsted Inspector, ranked the school 'good'. This was the first short inspection carried out since the school was also judged to be good by Ofsted in their previous inspection that was carried out in September 2014. The report went on to say that the leadership team has maintained the good quality of education in the school since the last inspection.

The report also said that the Catholic values held by the school are evident in the safe and welcoming community the school has become.

References

External links
St Columba's Catholic Boys' School official website

Secondary schools in the London Borough of Bexley
Catholic secondary schools in the Archdiocese of Southwark
Boys' schools in London
Academies in the London Borough of Bexley
Educational institutions established in 1973
1973 establishments in England
Bexleyheath